Meteora is the second studio album by American rock band Linkin Park. It was released on March 25, 2003, through Warner Bros. Records, following Reanimation, a collaboration album which featured remixes of songs included on their 2000 debut studio album Hybrid Theory. The album was produced by the band alongside Don Gilmore. The title Meteora is taken from the Greek Orthodox monasteries originally bearing the name. Meteora has a similar sound to Hybrid Theory, as described by critics, and the album took almost a year to be recorded. It is the first Linkin Park studio album to feature bassist Dave Farrell after he rejoined the band in 2000 following his temporary touring with other bands.

Meteora debuted at number one on the Billboard 200, selling over 810,000 copies in its first week. Linkin Park released singles from Meteora for over a year, including "Somewhere I Belong", "Faint", "Numb", "From the Inside", and "Breaking the Habit". “Lying from You” was released in March 2004 as a promotional single. Meteora received generally positive reviews, although some critics felt the album's style was too similar to its predecessor.

Meteora has sold around 16 million copies worldwide, making it the 8th best-selling album of the 21st century. It is certified 7× Platinum by the Recording Industry Association of America (RIAA). It was ranked number 36 on the Billboard Top 200 Albums of the 2000s. Some songs from the album were remixed with some of Jay-Z's songs for the EP Collision Course (2004). "Session" was nominated for Best Rock Instrumental Performance at the 46th Grammy Awards.

In February 2023, it was announced that the band would release a 20th anniversary edition of Meteora on April 7, 2023. Alongside this, they released a never before released demo titled "Lost" as the lead single of the reissue.

Writing and recording
In 2000, Linkin Park worked with music producer Don Gilmore to record and release their debut album, Hybrid Theory. Initial writing for a second album dated back to early 2001, while still touring in support of Hybrid Theory. The band had written around eighty different demos during their Hybrid Theory World Tour and LP Underground Tour, within the span of just eight months. Rough song ideas written then would find its way to the final album; notably 
the intro for "Somewhere I Belong". Bennington recorded guitar notes for it, but found it too folk rock sounding. However, Shinoda and Joe Hahn reworked it, adding effects to it, and then played it backwards, molding it into something the band was happy with. As explained by Shinoda: "Since I reversed it, it was playing 4-3-2-1. The chord progression was reversed. Then I cut it into four pieces, and I played it 1-2-3-4. And that's why it has that sweeping sound."

Prior to releasing a second album, the band instead chose to release a remix album, Reanimation, in 2002, produced by band member Mike Shinoda. The experience lead the band to want to co-produce their second album, while still working with Gilmore, hoping to expand on the sound of Hybrid Theory with more experimental ideas. In early 2002, after the touring, the writing continued in Mike's home studio, pre-production of the album began there. The band worked in pairs during the writing process, whereas Shinoda was always involved in all the songs. The recording of the songs mainly used Pro Tools, whereas the band used the traditional method of writing, in main studio. In June, pre-production terminated and the band headed for main production. The band finalized Don Gilmore as their producer. When Reanimation was released, the band had started to write the main content. Rob Bourdon spent eight hours a day in the studio for the recording of the album. By August, the band entered NRG Studios as Bennington also began writing songs with the band.

Linkin Park had finished versions of many songs before the actual recording process had begun, but they majorly wrote the finalized songs included in the track list in the studio. By October the drums were finalized and guitar parts were introduced by Brad in the control room of the studio. By the end of October, the bass parts were introduced. Don Gilmore himself being a bass player helped Farrell in his recording. The sampling part by Hahn was introduced just a month before the deadline, thereby Mike finished the recording of "Breaking the Habit" with strings arrangement by David Campbell; the song had been worked on by Shinoda for five or six years. The vocal production started in November. The mixing process as well as the album itself was finished in New York City.

Composition and themes
Lyrically, the album contains elements including depressing emotions, anger, and recovery. Explaining to MTV, Bennington said: "We don't talk about situations, we talk about the emotions behind the situations. Mike and I are two different people, so we can't sing about the same things, but we both know about frustration and anger and loneliness and love and happiness, and we can relate on that level." In the same interview, Shinoda explained it as: "What we really wanted to do was just push ourselves and push each other to really find new ways to be creative." He continued: "We wanted each sample that was in each song to be something that might perk your ear – something that you might not have ever heard before."

In a promotional interview, Rob Bourdon stated: "We wanted a group of songs that would sit well together because we wanted to make a record that you could pop into your CD player and, from beginning to end, there would never be a spot where you start daydreaming."

In titling the album, Mike said that "Meteora was a word that caught my attention because it sounded huge." Dave, Joe, and Chester elaborated that just like how Meteora, the rock formations in Greece, is very epic, dramatic, and has great energy, the band wanted the album to have that same feeling.

Genre-wise, the album is categorized as nu metal rap metal, rap rock, alternative rock and alternative metal, with elements of pop, electronica and hip-hop.

Promotion

 
The promotion for the album began well ahead before its release, as pictures of the band recording were distributed to the media. To support the album, there were many photo shoots of the band on October 29 at the Ambassador Hotel, where the band took a break from recording the album for two days, for designing the cover art of the album. "The Flem" and "Delta" helped the band for the art works, for the album as well as for the singles spawned by it. A TV commercial for the album was premiered on January 1, 2003.

"Somewhere I Belong" was released as the first single, premiering on US radio on February 24, 2003. Being released a month before the album release, it influenced the album sales performance worldwide. The second single off the album was "Faint", released before the band started its world tour. The third single "Numb" was released when Linkin Park performed it live in Madrid. "From the Inside" was released as the fourth single off the album before the North American leg of the world tour. "Breaking the Habit" was released while the band was in Indonesia. The album was released with various limited edition content for promotional purposes.

There is a special edition of Meteora, which includes the "Making of Meteora" DVD documentary. The special-edition package was packaged in a blue tinted case with the blue Meteora cover that can be found in some parts of Asia, United States, and more commonly in India. An alternate Indian version contains an alternate DVD and alternative cover that is packaged in a slimline case with the disc in original packaging. The "Tour Edition" of Meteora is packaged in a two disc set. The second disc, which is a Video CD, has the music videos for "Somewhere I Belong", "Faint", "Numb", and "Breaking the Habit". The tour edition is packaged in a standard Compact Disc case, rather than their trademark digipak case. The album was also released on a very limited quantity of vinyl records (spread across two LPs) under Warner Brothers. These are coveted by collectors and fetch high prices at auction. In 2014, Linkin Park released a demo version of Shinoda singing the song, on their 14th annual fan club CD, LPU XIV.

The band promoted the album with their Meteora World Tour and various other supporting tours. The world tour was supported by Hoobastank, P.O.D. and Story of the Year. The band played shows at Pellissier Building and Wiltern Theatre on the day before the album release and on the release date. The shows were called "'Meteora' Release Show". The European leg was cancelled because Chester was having severe back and abdominal pains. As a result, half of the music video of "Numb" was shot in Los Angeles and the Czech Republic. The album was also promoted by the Projekt Revolution festival. A live album was released in support of the album titled Live in Texas. Linkin Park played various special shows worldwide, including "Reading Ireland", as well as performing during the Kerrang! Awards, "Livid", "X-103's Not So Silent Night", "The End's Deck The Hall Ball" and "KROQ Almost Acoustic X-Mas", in promotion of the album.

Critical reception

Meteora received generally positive reviews, although critics noted that the album's musical style was similar to its predecessor, Hybrid Theory (2000). The overall Metacritic score is 62.
E! Online rated it A, and expected it to "shoot straight for the stars". Entertainment Weekly gave the album a B+, calling it a "thunderously hooky album that seamlessly blends the group's disparate sonic elements into radio-friendly perfection." Dot Music described it as a "guaranteed source of ubiquitous radio hits". Rolling Stone said the band "squeezed the last remaining life out of this nearly extinct formula". Billboard Magazine described Meteora as "a ready-made crowdpleaser". The New Musical Express said it had "massive commercial appeal" but left the reviewer "underwhelmed".

Writing for AllMusic, Stephen Thomas Erlewine described the album as "nothing more and nothing less than a Hybrid Theory part 2.", but added that the band "has discipline and editing skills, keeping this record at a tight 36 minutes and 41 seconds, a move that makes it considerably more listenable than its peers... since they know where to focus their energy, something that many nu-metal bands simply do not." Sputnikmusic writer Damrod criticized the album as being too similar to Hybrid Theory, but praised the album's production quality and catchiness, stating "the songs just invade your brain".

Blender described it as "harder, denser, uglier", while Q described it as "less an artistic endeavor than an exercise in target marketing."

Accolades
The song "Session" was nominated for a Grammy Award for Best Rock Instrumental Performance in 2004. Single from the album "Somewhere I Belong" won Best Rock Video at the 2003 MTV Video Music Awards. At the 2004 MTV Video Music Awards, "Breaking the Habit" was nominated for Best Rock Video but won MTV Viewer's Choice.

Commercial performance
In its first week, Meteora debuted at number one on the Billboard 200. The album sold 810,400 copies in the US and 36,700 in Canada its first week of release. In its second week, it sold an additional 265,000 copies in the US and stayed at the top for another week. As of June 2014, the album has sold 6.2 million copies in the US, and around 16 million copies worldwide. The album was ranked number 36 on Billboards Hot 200 Albums of the Decade.

Track listing

Multimedia part
 The Art of Meteora – 17:04
 "Somewhere I Belong" video
 LPTV
 Website tool-kit
 Extra
 Merch
 LP Underground

20th anniversary edition

In January 2023, the band started teasing the 20th anniversary of Meteora by updating their website, featuring a countdown to February 1, where it was speculated that they would be announcing something related to their second album. By the time that the countdown concluded, the website was updated again in the style of an interactive game that progressed every day up till the announcement of "Lost", on February 7, to commemorate the album's 20th anniversary. The previously unreleased demo was released on February 10 alongside the official announcement of the 20th anniversary reissue, which is scheduled to be released on April 7, 2023. The Deluxe CD features the original Andy Wallace mix of "Lost", called "Lost (2002 Mix)", as the 14th track of the first disc, after "Numb".

The 20th anniversary super deluxe boxset edition of Meteora, entitled Meteora20, features the original tracklist; an extended release of Live in Texas, featuring tracks previously omitted from the CD release; a previously unreleased live performance at Nottingham, England in 2003, titled Live in Nottingham 2003; previously released demos for the Linkin Park Underground fan club, titled LPU Rarities 2.0; previously released live recordings, titled Live Rarities 2003–2004; previously unreleased demos, titled Lost Demos; and three other previously unreleased content surrounding the album such as a documentary and other live concerts released on DVD.

 Track listing 
The 20th anniversary edition includes the original album (in CD, vinyl and digital) on disc one.

 Meteora – Live Around the World Meteora – Live Around the World'' is a live album which features live versions of seven songs from the second studio album, Meteora, similar to their prior live release, Hybrid Theory – Live Around the World. They were recorded in various cities around the world from 2007 to 2011. The album was released exclusively on iTunes.

"Foreword" is included before "Don't Stay".

 Track listing 

Personnel

Credits adapted from AllMusic.Linkin Park Chester Bennington – vocals
 Rob Bourdon – drums, backing vocals
 Brad Delson – guitar, backing vocals 
 Dave Farrell – bass guitar, backing vocals
 Joe Hahn – turntables, samples, backing vocals
 Mike Shinoda – rap vocals, vocals, samples, strings arrangement (7, 9)Additional musicians David Campbell – strings arrangement (7, 9)
 Joel Derouin, Charlie Bisharat, Alyssa Park, Sara Parkins, Michelle Richards, Mark Robertson – violins
 Evan Wilson, Bob Becker – violas
 Larry Corbett, Dan Smith – cellos
 David Zasloff – shakuhachi flute (11)Production Produced by Don Gilmore and Linkin Park
 Recorded by Don Gilmore
 John Ewing, Jr. – engineer
 Fox Phelps – assistant engineer
 Andy Wallace – mixing at Soundtrack Studios, New York, NY
 Steve Sisco – mixing assistance
 Brian "Big Bass" Gardner – mastering, digital editing at Bernie Grundman MasteringManagement Tom Whalley & Jeff Blue – A&R 
 Marny Cameron – A&R coordination
 Peter Standish & Kevin Sakoda – marketing directors 
 Worldwide representation: Rob McDermott for the Firm with Additional Servitude by Ryan Saullo, Ryan Demarti, and Noah Edelman
 Booking agent: Michael Arfin for Artist Group, International
 Danny Hayes – legal for Davis, Shapiro, Lewit, Montone & Hayes
 Michael Oppenheim & Jonathan Schwartz – business managers for Gudvi, Sussman & Oppenheim
 Worldwide licensing and merchandising: BandmerchArtwork'''
 Mike Shinoda & The Flem – creative direction
 The Flem – art direction & design
 Delta, Mike Shinoda, Joseph Hahn & The Flem – installation artists
 James R. Minchin III – photography 
 Nick Spanos – spray paint can close-up photos

Charts

Weekly charts

Year-end charts

Decade-end charts

Certifications and sales

References

External links

Linkin Park albums
2003 albums
Warner Records albums